Amphicoecia is a genus of moths belonging to the subfamily Tortricinae of the family Tortricidae.

Species
Amphicoecia adamana (Kennel, 1919)
Amphicoecia phasmatica (Meyrick in Caradja & Meyrick, 1937)

See also
List of Tortricidae genera

References

External links
tortricidae.com

Cnephasiini
Tortricidae genera